In the law of contracts, under the last shot rule, a party implicitly assented to and thereby accepted a counter-offer by conduct indicating lack of objection to it. In addition to being based on a questionable notion of implied assent, the last shot rule tended in practice to favor sellers over buyers, because sellers normally “fire the last shot” – i.e., send the last form.

See also
 Battle of the forms
 Offer and acceptance

Contract law